HMS Salisbury was a  or Type 61 aircraft direction frigate of the British Royal Navy. Completed in the late 1950s, Salisbury served through the 1960s and 1970s, participating in the Beira Patrol, blockading against Rhodesia and the confrontation with Iceland over fishing rights that was known as the Cod Wars. Salisbury became a harbour training ship in 1980, before being sunk as a target in 1985.

Design and construction
The ship was built at Devonport Dockyard, Plymouth as the lead ship of the class. Salisbury was laid down on 23 January 1952, launched on 25 June 1953, and completed on 27 February 1957.

The Type 61 class were aircraft direction frigates, fitted with a sophisticated battery of radar equipment which was intended to provide guidance to carrier and shore-based aircraft against aerial targets.

Operational history
In July 1958, Salisbury, took part in Operation Fortitude, when the aircraft carrier  supported an airlift of British troops to Jordan following a request by King Hussein of Jordan more military assistance in response to unrest following the formation of the United Arab Republic by Egypt and Syria and the 14 July Revolution in Iraq. In 1959, Salisbury visited Cleveland, Ohio and was first RN warship on Lake Erie since 1812. At that time, she was part of the 5th Frigate Squadron, serving in home waters, in the Mediterranean and in the Far East until August 1961. From 1961 to 1962, she was modernised with an improved radar suite, with Type 965 long-range radar fitted on a plated in Mack aft, replacing the previous Type 960 radar, and with the Type 293 target designation radar moved forward to a new foremast, while improved ESM equipment was also fitted.

Following her refit, Salisbury again served in home waters and in the Far East. On 25 June 1964, she sustained a collision with the destroyer  in the English Channel while returning from exercise. After repairs, the frigate attended the opening of Forth Road Bridge by Queen Elizabeth II. Salisbury sailed to the Far East where she took part in the Borneo Insurgency in 1963. The vessel's primary role was to ferry Gurkhas into the war zone and supplying manpower to patrol rivers in the ship's boats. Salisbury also patrolled off the coast of East Africa on the Socotra patrols. The frigate found both propellers split and was sent to a floating dock at Singapore for 30 days to fix. In 1967, she stood by during disturbances in the West Indies, being tasked to ferry the local police from St. Kitts and Nevis to the island of Anguilla where there was unrest. In the event the police forces failed to materialise and the ship landed her IS Platoon to restore order.  Whilst returning from the West Indies she sank the abandoned German tanker Essberger Chemist which was still afloat following an unsuccessful attempt by the nuclear submarine .

During 1967–70, Salisbury again underwent a major modernisation, with a launcher for Sea Cat surface-to-air missiles replacing the twin Bofors 40 mm gun mount aft. In 1975 she completed the last Beira Patrol.

In 1977 Salisbury  was part of the 1st Frigate Squadron and took part in the Fleet Review to celebrate Queen Elizabeth II's Silver Jubilee. In 1978, the frigate sailed to the Mediterranean Sea during negotiations for her sale to Egypt, but eventually returned to UK, the sale having fallen through.

From 1980–85, she was a harbour training ship at Devonport, before being replaced in that role by the frigate . On 30 September 1985, Salisbury was towed out and sunk as a target.

Commanding officers

References

Publications
  
 
 
 
 
 

 

Salisbury-class frigates
1953 ships
Ships of the Fishery Protection Squadron of the United Kingdom